Lokanath Behera (born 17 June 1961) is a retired Indian Police Service (I.P.S.) officer. He was State Police Chief and Director General of Police (DGP) of the Kerala State Police. He was the former Director of Vigilance in the state of Kerala, after T. P. Senkumar IPS was reappointed as the Kerala State Police Chief and  Director General of Police following  the verdict of the honorable Supreme Court of India. Behera is from Odisha. He was one of the founding members of the National Investigation Agency (NIA). He was also instrumental in modernizing the Kerala police, equipping it with modern vehicles and state-of-the-art small arms and non-lethal weaponry.

He was reappointed as Managing Director of Kochi Metro on 28 August 2021 by the Government of Kerala.

Education
Behera holds a master's degree in Geology from Utkal University.

Career
Behera was appointed to the IPS in 1985 and is a part of the Kerala cadre. He started his career as an ASP, in Kerala and also served as Commissioner of Police in Kochi and DCP in Thiruvananthapuram.

He was then appointed as SP and later DIG in the Central Bureau of Investigation. He was involved in the investigation of sensitive cases such as the Graham Staines murder case, Purulia arms drop case, Mumbai serial blast case, etc. 

In 2009, he joined the National Investigation Agency (NIA) and was one of the founder members. At the NIA, he headed the Terror Financing and Fake Currency specialized cell of the NIA.

Prior to being appointed as the DGP of the Kerala Police, he served as Director, Kerala Fire And Rescue Services. He was a part of the team that traveled to the United States to question David Headley in 2010.

Behera retired from service on 30 June 2021.

Awards
While on deputation at the NIA, Behera was awarded the President's Police Medal for Distinguished Service in 2009.

References

1961 births
Living people
Utkal University alumni
Indian Police Service officers
Indian civil servants
All India Services
Indian government officials